UFC Fight Night: Cowboy vs. Edwards (also known as UFC Fight Night 132) was a mixed martial arts event produced by the Ultimate Fighting Championship that was held on June 23, 2018, at Singapore Indoor Stadium in Kallang, Singapore.

Background
A welterweight bout between former UFC Lightweight Championship challenger Donald Cerrone and Leon Edwards headlined the event.

Ashkan Mokhtarian was expected to face Jenel Lausa at the event. However, Mokhtarian pulled out of the fight in early May citing injury. He was replaced by Ulka Sasaki.

Nadia Kassem was scheduled to face Yan Xiaonan  at the event. However, Kassem pulled out of the fight in mid-May and was replaced by Viviane Pereira.

Results

Bonus awards
The following fighters received $50,000 bonuses:
Fight of the Night: Shane Young vs. Rolando Dy
Performance of the Night: Ovince Saint Preux and Song Yadong

See also
List of UFC events
2018 in UFC
List of current UFC fighters

References

UFC Fight Night
Mixed martial arts in Singapore
2018 in mixed martial arts
Sport in Singapore
2018 in Singapore
June 2018 sports events in Asia